The Build! Build! Build! Infrastructure Program (BBB) was the infrastructure program of the administration of Rodrigo Duterte, the 16th president of the Philippines. A key component of his socioeconomic policy, the program aimed to reduce poverty, encourage economic growth and reduce congestion in Metro Manila, and address the country's infrastructure gap. Launched on April 18, 2017, the program also included the continuation of 44 infrastructure projects under previous administrations.

The Build! Build! Build! program was superseded by the Build Better More (BBM) infrastructure program of the administration of Duterte's successor, Bongbong Marcos; government officials have described the new program as an expansion of the BBB program.

List of associated projects 
In November 2019, the government revised its list of flagship infrastructure projects under the program, expanding it to 100. It was revised again in August 2020, bringing the total number of projects to 104, expanding its scope included health, information and communications technology, as well as water infrastructure projects to support the country's economic growth and recovery from the effects of the COVID-19 pandemic. As of September 11, 2020, 24 projects are still in the approval & planning stages, while 80 were under implementation.

Public transportation

Roads

Airports

Seaports

Urban development

Water resources

Information and communications technology

Health

Impact 
As of July 2021, 214 airport projects, 451 commercial social and tourism port projects,  of roads, 5,950 bridges, 11,340 flood control projects, 11,340 evacuation centers, and 150,149 classrooms had been completed under the infrastructure program. The numbers cited include newly-built infrastructure, and projects involving the repair, rehabilitation, widening, and expansion of existing infrastructure.

However despite the massive expenditure program and with only two months left before Duterte leaves office, as of April 28, 2022, only 12 out of 119 Flagship Build Build Build projects have been completed so far.  Officials were quick to point out that despite the low completion rate of projects, the current administration has consistently spent more on infrastructure than past administrations. The remaining projects will be passed on to future administrations for completion and consideration.

The Philippine Daily Inquirer, citing a study from Pantheon Macroeconomics, wrote that "the Duterte administration has failed to achieve its ambitious spending targets despite having rolled out more infrastructure projects under the BBB program", citing the effect of the COVID-19 pandemic which affected infrastructure spending in 2020 as large portions of the budget had been reallocated to COVID-19 response efforts.

References 

Presidency of Rodrigo Duterte
Economic history of the Philippines